Edward Keith Randell (born 2 July 1988) is an English musician and actor, who is perhaps best known for his acting work in the Harry Potter film series and as a bass for the noted international vocal group The Swingle Singers.

He was born in Dulwich, an area of South London, England and was educated at City University London.

His first professional acting role was in the 2002 film adaptation of Harry Potter and the Chamber of Secrets, in which he played wizard and Hogwarts student Justin Finch-Fletchley, a member of Hufflepuff and initially a friend of Harry's. His character is then threatened by a snake, under the presumed influence of Harry (who communicated in Parseltongue), and is later found petrified. Although Randell's character, a member of Dumbledore's Army, features over the course of the book series, Randell himself only appeared in the films once during the series, and the fate of the character in the film series is unknown.

Randell was also a member and bassist for the vocal group The Swingles from 2012. to 2022. He is also a freelance journalist, holding a degree in Magazine Journalism from City University London.

Filmography

References 

British male film actors
Living people
1988 births
English male film actors
21st-century English male actors
People from Dulwich
English basses
21st-century English singers
21st-century British male singers
The Swingle Singers members